The Drazdy conflict (sometimes spelled Drozdy) was a July 1998 incident involving the Government of Belarus and diplomats from other nations. It began with the leader of Belarus, Alexander Lukashenko, declaring the Drazdy Complex as property of the government and shutting it down for repairs. The Drazdy Complex housed several diplomats from various nations, including several Western nations. Though Lukashenko tried to negotiate a situation with Western powers, such as France and Germany, by appointing Uladzimir Herasimovich for talks, the situation was not solved in time. In protest of the incident, the US temporarily recalled its ambassador, Daniel V. Speckhard, who spent one year back in Washington before returning to Belarus. One of the results of the incident was that the European Union issued Lukashenko and approximately 130 other government officials with travel bans that prevented them from traveling to fourteen of the then-fifteen EU states. This also began to lead the United States and non-EU states to issue similar bans (the United States has an exemption for visits to the United Nations headquarters in New York City, New York by the banned officials). According to ITAR-TASS and BelaPAN, the Drazdy Complex is now used as a residence for the president and the evicted diplomats were given new locations in Minsk.

See also
Foreign relations of Belarus
Belarus–United States relations

References

External links
U.S. Embassy Minsk Policy Statement on the “Drozdy Dispute”. Retrieved 2009-01-02
Radio Free Europe
Encyclopædia Britannica

Foreign relations of the European Union
Foreign relations of Belarus
1998 in Belarus
1998 in international relations
Diplomatic incidents
Alexander Lukashenko